The Super League (formerly known as SuperLeague and Premier League) is the top tier men's basketball league in Ireland. The league has 14 teams (13 in the Republic of Ireland and one in Northern Ireland). The league is an active member of Basketball Ireland, which is recognised by FIBA (also known as the International Basketball Federation) as the national governing body for basketball in Ireland. Neptune hold the record for most league titles, having won the competition 11 times.

Teams

History

Early years
In 1973, the Irish Basketball Association established a national basketball competition for men with two divisions. This saw many Dublin-based clubs enter their Men's A team into the top flight league, with the likes of Killester, St. Vincent's Dublin and Marian competing for supremacy against Cork-based clubs Blue Demons and Neptune. After six seasons, Kerry-born Killarney player Paudie O'Connor felt that Irish basketball was short of quality. O'Connor wanted to add glamour to the game and make it more appealing, believing showmanship and skills such as slam dunking would bring basketball to a new level in Ireland. Despite objections from the governing body and other clubs across the country, the first American players, Greg Huguley and Cornel Benford, arrived in Killarney in September 1979. Two months later, Brian Ulmer replaced Benford and St. Vincent's Killarney went on to clinch the national league title in the 1979–80 season. The addition of Americans transformed the Irish game. As a result, the league brought in regulations to limit the number of foreign-born players to two and thus prevent the full professionalisation of the league, as had happened in Britain.

A golden era
O'Connor went back to the States in 1981 and recruited Arnold Vesey and Tony Andre, the latter becoming Irish basketball's first superstar. The pair helped Killarney win their second title in three years, and their success paved the way for further American success in the top flight league. Both Cork teams, Blue Demons and Neptune, began recruiting Americans as a result of Killarney's rise, and Neptune found one of their best ever imports – Terry Strickland. Strickland helped Neptune become the ultimate powerhouse throughout the 1980s, as they won four titles in a row between 1984–85 and 1987–88. Blue Demons and Neptune had a fierce rivalry during the 1980s – every title between 1980–81 and 1990–91 was won by one of those sides (except 1981–82). Terry Strickland of Neptune and Jasper McElroy of Blue Demons led their sides to success, but had fierce competition coming up against the likes of Kelvin Troy and Mario Elie (Killester), Dave Hopla (St. Gall's), and Deora Marsh (Ballina).

While the local Irish players were all amateurs, the American imports had to register as professionals. To afford such players, sponsors were a big part of every club. The IBA promoted a scheme whereby investors put money into clubs, and in return, the players will be walking billboards for their brand. However, there were instances when the lack of big sponsors and talent led to clubs struggling to keep up with the increased competition. Marian were champions in 1978, but the new semi-professional era of the league saw them get left behind, and following the 1982–83 season, the team was relegated from the top flight league. They had a very successful campaign in Division 2 in 1983–84, finishing a close second behind Liam McHale's Ballina, and earned promotion back to the top flight. However, following the 1985–86 season, Marian were relegated for a second time, returning again for the 1987–88 season.

In 1986 and 1987, plans were put in place to reduce the number of imports a team can have. 80% of the clubs agreed that the number should be reduced from two to one, and with the support of the IBA, the ruling came into play for the 1988–89 season. There was a very negative reaction to the change in Cork, as they felt they were being unjustly treated and punished for being successful. The two main arguments made for the change was to give local Irish players more opportunities and to cut costs, with it becoming too expensive to pay two imports for some clubs. As a result of the change, the hype of Irish basketball began to wear down and the public became disinterested in the sport throughout the 1990s.

Post-halcyon
Neptune continued to be the dominant team throughout the 1990s and early 2000s. Belfast's Star of the Sea began to challenge them in the late 1990s as they collected three National Championships between 1996 and 1998, and won two league titles in 1998 and 1999.

In 1998, the league's long association with sponsor Budweiser came to an end, and thus ESB became the new sponsor. In addition, a new format was introduced for the 1998–99 season. A relaunch of the league was inevitable with the change of sponsor but the IBA also took the opportunity to devise yet another new format, which resulted in the expansion of the Superleague to 14 teams – effectively, an amalgamation of the two men's national league divisions from 1997–98.

Due to the 2001 foot-and-mouth outbreak, the 2000–01 season was abandoned in March 2001. The 2001 title was originally not awarded to any team, despite the fact that Killester were leaders at the time of abandonment. The National Championships, due to be held on 24/25 March, were also abandoned. The following month, an IBA panel declared that Killester were the winners for 2001.

In 2003, North and South Conferences were introduced into the league. As a result, the league champion would be determined by the team who made it through to and won the grand final. Prior to 2003–04, the league title was awarded to the team who finished on top of the ladder and the runner-up was who finished second on the ladder; a post-season tournament was then held to determine a National Champion. Past National Champions include St. Vincent's (1995, 1999 and 2003), Star of the Sea (1996–98), Notre Dame (2000) and Tralee Tigers (2002). In 2012–13, the league reverted to the old model and removed conferences, re-establishing league champions as the top of the ladder finishers, and established a Champions Trophy tournament for the final two weeks of the season.

New era
In 2013, Basketball Ireland rebranded the competition and changed the name from SuperLeague to Premier League. Over the next three seasons, UCC Demons won seven of the nine trophies, including going unbeaten in the 2014–15 season.

In 2015, Basketball Ireland's representative team Hibernia played in the FIBA Europe Cup. The team's roster was filled with Premier League players.

In 2016, Basketball Ireland renamed the competition "Super League" for the 2016–17 season.

Roll of Honour

See also
Basketball Ireland

References

External links
Basketball Ireland website
bi.comortais.com archives
We Got Game: The Golden Age of Irish Basketball
Basketball Ireland Men's League, Cup and Champions Trophy archive

 
Basketball competitions in Ireland
Basketball leagues in Europe
Sports leagues in Ireland
1973 establishments in Ireland
Professional sports leagues in Ireland